Pseudorhaphitoma venusta is a small sea snail, a marine gastropod mollusk in the family Mangeliidae.

Description

Distribution
This marine genus occurs off Somalia.

References

 Morassi M., La Conchiglia vol. 26/272, 1994

External links
 

Endemic fauna of Somalia
venusta
Gastropods described in 1994